The Richton School District is a public school district based in Richton, Mississippi (USA).

In addition to Richton, the district also serves rural areas in northeastern Perry County.

Schools
Richton High School (Grades 7-12)
Richton Elementary School (Grades K-6)

Demographics

2006-07 school year
There were a total of 760 students enrolled in the Richton School District during the 2006–2007 school year. The gender makeup of the district was 51% female and 49% male. The racial makeup of the district was 25.66% African American, 72.89% White, 1.18% Hispanic, and 0.26% Asian. 54.0% of the district's students were eligible to receive free lunch.

Previous school years

Accountability statistics

Notable alumni

JaCoby Jones, professional baseball player

See also
List of school districts in Mississippi

References

External links
 

Education in Perry County, Mississippi
School districts in Mississippi